Featured here is a chronological (by publication) list of story arcs in the epic space opera/fantasy comic book series Saga, which is created by writer Brian K. Vaughan and artist Fiona Staples. Saga premiered in March 2012, and is published monthly by Image Comics.

Each issue of Saga is titled with a numerical Chapter, such as "Chapter 1" for the debut issue. Every six chapters comprise a story arc designated as a "Volume" and are reprinted as trade paperbacks. Every three Volumes comprise a "Book" and are collected as hardcover editions.

Book One

Volume One
The first trade paperback collection, Saga, Vol. 1, which collects the first six issues, was published October 10, 2012, and appeared at Number 6 on the New York Times Graphic Books Best Seller list the week of October 29.

Volume Two
The second trade paperback collection, Saga, Vol. 2, which collects issues #7-12, was released June 19, 2013.

Volume Three
The third trade paperback collection, Saga, Vol. 3, which collects issues #13–18, was released March 19, 2014.

Book Two

Volume Four
The fourth trade paperback collection, Saga, Vol. 4, which collects issues #19-24, was released on December 17, 2014, the same day as Saga Deluxe Edition volume 1, a hardcover that reprints the first 18 issues, or Book One of the series, comprising its first three-story arcs.

Volume Five

Volume Six

Book Three

Volume Seven: "The War for Phang"

Volume Eight: "The Coffin"

Volume Nine

Book Four

Volume Ten
Volume Ten is set three years after Marko's death, and a week after Hazel's tenth birthday, making her the same age as the series. The arc introduces Hazel's adolescent love of music, and addresses her grief over the death of her father. The arc is collected in a volume with an October 2022 publication date, while the series is scheduled to resume in January 2023.

Volume Eleven
The opening of Volume Eleven, which is Chapter 61, is set six months after the end of Chapter Sixty. With this issue, the series increased in price to $3.99, after having been priced at $2.99 since its debut.

References

Notes

Inline citations

External links

Science fantasy comics
Space opera
Saga